The Italian Catholic Diocese of Vallo della Lucania, in Campania, has existed under this name since 1945. It is a suffragan of the Archdiocese of Salerno-Campagna-Acerno.

Before renaming in 1945, it was the historical Diocese of Capaccio and Vallo.

Bishops

Diocese of Capaccio

Latin Name: Caputaquensis
Erected: 12th Century

Diocese of Capaccio e Vallo della Lucania
Latin Name: Caputaquensis et Vallensis
Name Changed: 16 July 1851

Giovanni Battista Siciliani, O.F.M. Conv.  (20 Jun 1859 Confirmed – 24 Oct 1876 Died) 
Pietro Maglione  (18 Dec 1876 – 17 Dec 1900 Resigned) 
Paolo Jacuzio  (17 Dec 1900 – 9 Jul 1917 Appointed, Archbishop of Sorrento) 
Francesco Cammarota  (22 Dec 1917 – 15 Dec 1935 Died) 
Raffaele De Giuli  (17 Jun 1936 – 18 Feb 1946 Appointed, Bishop of Albenga)

Diocese of Vallo di Lucania
Latin Name: Vallensis in Lucania
Name Changed: 24 November 1945

Domenico Savarese  (11 Jan 1947 – 3 Oct 1955 Died) 
Biagio d’Agostino  (24 Feb 1956 – 26 Oct 1974 Retired) 
Giuseppe Casale (26 Oct 1974 – 7 May 1988 Appointed, Archbishop of Foggia-Bovino) 
Giuseppe Rocco Favale (4 Mar 1989 – 7 May 2011 Retired) 
Ciro Miniero (7 May 2011 – )

References

Bibliography

Reference works
 p. 870-871.(Use with caution; obsolete)

Studies

Kamp, Norbert (1973). Kirche und Monarchie im staufischen Königreich Sizilien. Prosopographische Grundlegung. Bistümer und Bischöfe des Königreichs 1194-1266. 1. Abruzzen und Kampanien, Munich 1973, pp. 454-459. 
Kehr, Paul Fridolin (1925). Italia pontificia Vol. VIII (Berlin: Weidmann 1925), pp. 276–278.

External links

Roman Catholic dioceses in Campania
Roman Catholic dioceses established in the 12th century